Moragolla is a village in Sri Lanka. It is located within Central Province.

Energy 
Moragolla is the last major Hydro Power Plant in Mahaweli Ganga Hydro Power Scheme. The project site is located on the upper reaches of the Mahaweli Ganga in the Central Highlands, approximately 22 km south of Kandy City close to the village of Ulapane in the Kandy district and about 130 km North-East of Colombo.

Green Power Development & Energy Efficiency Improvement Investment Programme of Ceylon Electricity Board funded by Asian Development Bank with the Project Consultancy of Nippon Koei Co. Limited, Japan and Fitchner GmbH, Germany formulated this 30 MW Hydro Power Project.

Minel Lanka is the Bid Consultant for China Gezhouba Group Co. Limited, China in Project Lot A2 - Main Civil Construction Works to become the First Chinese EPC company to win a Power Generation Project in Sri Lanka under International Competitive Bidding and Financing.

Moragolla Hydro Power Plant consists of 37 m high dam with five spillway gates, intake, head race tunnel, surge tank, penstock tunnel and shaft, power house with switchyard, relocation of irrigation and access roads.

See also
 List of towns in Central Province, Sri Lanka
 Moragolla Dam

External links

References

Populated places in Central Province, Sri Lanka